Dermochrosia is a monotypic genus of Brazilian huntsman spiders containing the single species, Dermochrosia maculatissima. It was first described by Cândido Firmino de Mello-Leitão in 1940, and is found in Brazil.

See also
 List of Sparassidae species

References

Monotypic Araneomorphae genera
Sparassidae
Spiders of Brazil
Taxa named by Cândido Firmino de Mello-Leitão